Kwon Yi-goo (born June 11, 1987) is a South Korean professional badminton player. He currently has 100 career wins, with a career doubles record of 86 wins and 56 losses. His combined career earnings equal US$29,624.

Career 
Kwon Yi-goo won the Vietnam Open in men's doubles with Ko Sung-hyun in 2007. At the 2007 Summer Universiade, both came fifth in doubles. In 2009 he won bronze at the East Asian Games in men's doubles with Kim Ki-jung. At the Chinese Taipei Open 2010 he finished second in doubles with Cho Gun-woo. He also took part in the 2011 World Badminton Championship.

References

Living people
South Korean male badminton players
East Asian Games
1987 births